Politics Show is an hour-long BBC One television political programme which was broadcast in the United Kingdom on Sundays between 2003 and 2011, broadcasting usually at midday.

Politics Show was superseded by Sunday Politics, a weekend version of Daily Politics, which retains some of the elements of the former show.

History 
During 2000, the then Director-General of the BBC Greg Dyke ordered a review of political output from BBC, which was carried out by Fran Unsworth, leading to a major overhaul of political output in 2002. A number of flagship programmes were cancelled, including On the Record, Despatch Box and Westminster Live and replaced with new programmes.

The Politics Show become the Sunday flagship lunchtime politics show hosted by Jeremy Vine. The show retained On the Records serious agenda and a long-form interview as its centrepiece and contained reports on the big political stories of the week as well as analysing the way these stories will affect people all over the country. The Politics Show also replaced a number of regional political programmes on BBC2, by including a 20-minute opt-out for each of the English regions, Scotland, Wales and Northern Ireland fronted by a different presenter for each region, looking into how political stories affect the local area.

In September 2005 Jeremy Vine left the show and was replaced by BBC News presenter Jon Sopel. Susanna Reid and Tim Donovan, deputy political editor James Landale and political correspondents Laura Kuenssberg and Jo Coburn have all presented in place of Sopel.

The programme aired for the final time on 11 December 2011. It was replaced from 15 January 2012 by Sunday Politics, a weekend version of The Daily Politics, with Andrew Neil as the main presenter.

The Politics Show ScotlandThe Politics Show Scotland ''' was BBC Scotland's main political programme broadcast on Sundays.  It followed the same format as the London version until a major overhaul of Scottish political programmes took place, which resulted in the axing of the Friday edition of Politics Scotland in 2007 and Holyrood in 2009 which were both presented by Iain Macwhirter, and incorporating them into the new programme. The new format resulted in Scotland taking the first 20-30min of the national broadcast then opting-out to provide a full one-hour show analysing the big political stories of the week in Scotland.  The programme aired for the final time on 18 December 2011, with a review of 2011.

From 15 January 2012, The Politics Show was replaced by weekend version of The Daily Politics, hosted by Andrew Neil (who also hosts the weekday version on Wednesdays – Fridays). The programme was thus renamed Sunday Politics Scotland which continued with the same format.

Presenters
Presenter/Holyrood correspondent: Isabel Frazer
Political editor: Brian Taylor
Reporter: Catriona Renton
Holyrood correspondent: Raymond Buchanan
Westminster correspondents: David Porter and Tim Reid
 Original Presenter: Glenn Campbell 2003 – 2007, Iain Macwhirter 2007 – 2008

Regional opt-out teams

Yorkshire and Lincolnshire
Presenter/political editor (East Yorkshire & Lincolnshire): Tim Iredale
Reporter/political editor (Yorkshire & North Midlands): Len Tingle

N.B. The Yorkshire and Lincolnshire opt-out is broadcast to both Yorkshire and Yorkshire and Lincolnshire sub-regions.

East
Presenter: Etholle George
Political editor: Deborah McGurran
Reporter: Clive Lewis

East Midlands
Presenter: Marie Ashby
Political editor: John Hess
Reporter: Robin Powell

Wales/Cymru
Presenter: Felicity Evans
Political editor: Betsan Powys
Reporters: Mark Hannaby (Videojournalist), John Stevenson (Bangor)
and Bethan James (Westminster)
Online journalist: John Cooper
Producer: Mark Palmer

London
Reporter: Andrew Cryan
Producer: Ian Laughlin

North East & Cumbria
Presenter/political editor : Richard Moss
Producer: Michael Wild
Political correspondent: Mark Denten
Reporters: Emily Unia, Luke Walton and Fergus Hewison

North West
Presenter: Annabel Tiffin
Political editor: Arif Ansari
Reporters: Lucy Breakwell and Elaine Dunkley
Producer: Michelle Mayman

South
Presenter/political editor: Peter Henley
Producer: Ian Paul

South East
Presenters: Natalie Graham and Julia George
Political editor: Louise Stewart
Reporter: Helen Drew 1
Producer: Jaswinder Bancil

South West
Presenter/political editor: Martyn Oates
Reporter/researcher: Ben Woolvin
Producer: Jimmi Jones

West
Presenter: David Garmston
Reporter: Paul Barltrop

West Midlands
Presenter/political editor: Patrick Burns
Reporter: Susana Mendonça
Producer: Nicholas Watson

Northern Ireland
The Northern Irish version usually followed the UK with a 20-minute opt out and returning for the final 10 minutes. Occasionally when there are big stories in Northern Ireland or election debates, they broadcast for the full hour and do not show the London edition.  They also broadcast the full 20-minute NI edition after the late night news on a Sunday evening usually 10.20pm to 10.40pm.

Presenter: Tara Mills (2011–present – hosted Politics Show for four months after Fitzpatrick's departure and continues on the Sunday Politics in 2012. Also hosts Stormont today for BBC NI)
 Former presenter – Jim Fitzpatrick (2003–2011 – left after 2011 election to become Business Editor on BBC Newsline but is still on the Sunday Politics'' production team)
Political editor: Mark Davenport
Political correspondents: Gareth Gordon, Yvette Shapero and Martina Purdy

References

External links
 

2003 British television series debuts
2000s British political television series
2010s British political television series
BBC television news shows
British political television series
2011 British television series endings
Current affairs shows